South Bay is a waterway in Kivalliq Region, Nunavut, Canada. It is located in Hudson Bay, off southwestern Southampton Island. It is west of Native Bay. The Kirchoffer River empties into the bay.

Coral Harbour
The small Inuit community of Coral Harbour is located on the bay's northern shore,  from the mouth of the bay. The bay is notable for its fossilized coral which lends its name to the community.

References

Bays of Kivalliq Region